The Emergency Internal Revenue Tax Act of 1914 was a United States temporary tax in response to President Wilson calling for $100 million in additional Federal revenue in the event of war.  The taxes instituted under this Act were initially set to expire on December 31, 1915; however, on December 17, 1915, Congress passed a joint resolution that continued the taxes through December 31, 1916.

Taxes
The act taxed legacies and inherited personal property on a graduated scale according to the size of the estate and the degree of relationship to the deceased (surviving husbands and wives received a general exemption).  A maximum rate of 15% applied to bequests from estates valued over $1 million to distant relatives, non-relatives, or "bodies politic or corporate."  The act also included an excise on receipts in excess of $200,000 assessed to firms in the petroleum and sugar refining industries.  It raised stamp rates, and it placed a .01 cent tax on every telephone call costing more than .15 cents, making it the 1st telephone tax in U.S. history.

References

United States federal taxation legislation
History of taxation in the United States